This is a list of nationwide and statewide public opinion polls that have been conducted relating to the Republican primaries for the 2024 United States presidential election. The persons named in the polls are declared candidates or have received media speculation about their possible candidacy. The polls included are among Republicans or Republicans and Republican-leaning independents. If multiple versions of polls are provided, the version among likely voters is prioritized, then registered voters, then adults.

Background

Nationwide polling
 Aggregate polls

Head-to-head polling

Statewide polling

Alabama primary

Arizona primary

Arkansas primary

California primary

Florida primary

Georgia primary

Illinois primary

Indiana primary

Iowa caucus

Kansas caucus

Louisiana primary

Maine caucus

Maryland primary

Massachusetts primary

Michigan primary

Mississippi primary

Missouri primary

Montana primary

Nevada caucus

New Hampshire primary

North Carolina primary

Ohio primary

Oklahoma primary

Pennsylvania primary

Rhode Island primary

South Carolina primary

Tennessee primary

Texas primary

Utah caucus

Virginia primary

See also
2024 Republican National Convention
Nationwide opinion polling for the 2024 Democratic Party presidential primaries

Nationwide opinion polling for the 2024 United States presidential election

Notes

Partisan clients

References

External links
Primary poll tracker from FiveThirtyEight

2024 United States Republican presidential primaries
Republican Party